Umberto Sacripante (2 October 1904 – 14 January 1975) was an Italian film and stage actor.

Life and career 
He made his film debut in 1930, and in a short time he became one of the most active character actors of his time. Thanks to his good knowledge of German language, he was also often cast in German and Austrian productions. He also worked as general organizer for the production company Cines, and also was secretary of the National Syndicate of Film Actors.

Personal life  
Sacripante was married to Assunta Lelli. Their sons Luciano and Mauro both worked in the cinema industry, respectively as film director and executive producer.

Selected filmography 
 Figaro and His Great Day (1931)
 Lowered Sails (1931)
 Five to Nil (1932)
 Zaganella and the Cavalier (1932)
 The Gift of the Morning (1932)
 Fanny (1933)
 Tourist Train (1933)
 Seconda B (1934)
 The Dance of Time (1936)
 Condottieri (1937)
 The Mountain Calls (1938)
 All of Life in One Night (1938)
 No Man's Land (1939)
 Department Store (1939)
 Red Tavern (1940)
 An Adventure of Salvator Rosa (1940) 
 La zia smemorata (1940)
 The Ways of Sin (1946)
 Tragic Hunt (1947)
 The Thief of Venice (1950)
 O.K. Nerone (1951)
 Guilt Is Not Mine (1952)
 The Mute of Portici (1952)
 Cavallina storna (1953)
 Peppino e la vecchia signora (1954)
 Escape to the Dolomites (1955)
 The Mysteries of Paris (1957)
 Robin Hood and the Pirates (1960)

References

External links 
 
 

1904 births
1975 deaths
20th-century Italian male actors
Italian male film actors
Italian male stage actors
Male actors from Rome